DXCO (1044 AM) Radyo Pilipino is a radio station owned and operated by Radyo Pilipino Media Group through its licensee Radyo Pilipino Corporation. The station's studio is located at Brgy. Igpit, Opol, Misamis Oriental.

On-air illegal gambling controversy
The radio station has been already raided by the Philippine National Police and GMA Network's public service program Imbestigador on their July 2, 2011 episode because of the non-stop on-air illegal gambling.

References

Radio stations in Cagayan de Oro
News and talk radio stations in the Philippines
Radio stations established in 1968